Polychrysia moneta, the golden plusia, is a moth of the family Noctuidae. It is found in the Palearctic realm (Europe, Asia Minor, Turkey, Armenia, Azerbaijan, Caucasus, and northwest Iran).

Technical description and variation

The wingspan is 32–37 mm. Forewing pale golden, diffusely tinged in median area with brown and sprinkled with black scales; the veins brown; the median shade conspicuously dark brown, thick, angled in middle: lines brown, double; the inner acutely angled on subcostal, below middle inwardly curved; outer line lunulate dentate; basal area flaked with golden scales; a pale golden apical blotch, cut and edged below by the brown submarginal line, which is rarely plain below middle; orbicular stigma large, oblique, horseshoe-shaped, with broad silvery outline and gold and brown centre, coalescing with a similar but inverted mark on vein 2; reniform hardly traceable; hindwing shining fuscous;the fringe pale.

Biology
The moth flies from May to October depending on the location.

Larva dull dark green, black spotted, living when young in the heart of the central shoots; later, with dark dorsal vessel, limited by several whitish lines and a white lateral line. The larvae feed on Delphinium, Artemisia absinthium and Artemisia vulgaris.

References

External links

Golden Plusia at UKmoths
Funet Taxonomy
Fauna Europaea
Lepiforum.de
Vlindernet.nl 

Plusiinae
Moths of Europe
Moths described in 1787